Daviesia pachyloma is a species of flowering plant in the family Fabaceae and is endemic to the south-west of Western Australia. It is an erect, bushy or spreading shrub with zigzagging branches, sharply-pointed, narrowly elliptic to linear phyllodes, and yellow and red flowers.

Description

Taxonomy and naming
Daviesia pachyloma was first formally described in 1853 by Nikolai Turczaninow in the Bulletin de la Société Impériale des Naturalistes de Moscou. The specific epithet (pachyloma) means "thick hem", referring to the edge of the phyllodes.

The original publication gave the name Daviesia pachylima, a transcription error from Turczaninow's handwriting. The epithet pachylina has no etymological meaning, and may explain why George Bentham changed the spelling to pachylina ("thick thread") in Flora Australiensis.

Distribution and habitat
This daviesia grows in scattered populations in woodland between Manmanning, Zanthus, Kulin and Holt Rock in the Avon Wheatbelt, Coolgardie, Great Victoria Desert and Mallee biogeographic regions of south-western Western Australia.

Conservation status
Daviesia pachyloma is listed as "not threatened" by the Government of Western Australia Department of Biodiversity, Conservation and Attractions.

References

pachyloma
Eudicots of Western Australia
Plants described in 1853
Taxa named by Nikolai Turczaninow